The Magic Pudding is a 2000 Australian animated musical adventure comedy film loosely adapted from the 1918 book of the same name by Norman Lindsay. Directed by Karl Zwicky, the film features an voice cast of well known actors including Sam Neill, Geoffrey Rush, Hugo Weaving, Jack Thompson, Toni Collette and John Cleese.

The film was produced by Energee Entertainment, an Australian studio that also created the Wicked! series. Energee shut down in 2002 due to financial losses from The Magic Pudding.

Plot
In the South Pole, Bill Barnacle, his first mate Sam Sawnoff a penguin, and crewman Buncle a wombat, are shipwrecked after their ship is destroyed by a big wave. After Bill stops a starving Buncle from eating Sam, the iceberg cracks and produces an everlasting magic bowl of pudding. Buncle runs off with the pudding and claims it as his own, but the ice breaks and he falls into the sea. Bill and Sam manage to rescue the pudding, and after briefly mourning the apparent loss of Buncle, they choose to become the Pudding Owners dedicated to protecting it from thievery. The pudding is revealed to be alive and named Albert, who has a rude demeanor and demands that they continue to eat him.

Ten years later, a young koala named Bunyip Bluegum discovers that he is not an orphan and sets out on a quest to find his parents, Meg and Tom Bluegum. During his journey, he stumbles upon Bill and Sam and accidentally foils an attempt to steal Albert by two pudding thieves. Bill and Sam introduce each other to Bunyip and also introduce Albert, who reveals he's a thrill-seeker who often runs away to challenge other animals to try and eat him. Bunyip tries to ask a bandicoot with a watermelon for help in finding his parents, and the bandicoot tells Bunyip that the only one not afraid to reveal the answer is a frog on the log. Shortly after, Bunyip helps Bill and Sam foil another attempt by the pudding thieves to steal Albert, and Bill and Sam officially welcome Bunyip to the Pudding Owners group while explaining their history, and the four go together to find Bunyip's parents.

Meanwhile, Buncle is revealed to be alive and living underground, having enslaved a valley into bringing him food while still desiring to take Albert for himself. He is also revealed to be the one who has sent the pudding thieves, his nephew Watkin and his friend Patrick O'Possum, to bring him Albert, and it's also shown that one of the enslaved citizens are Meg and Tom Bluegum. 

After foiling another attempt by the thieves to steal Albert, Bunyip falls into a creek where he dreams/hallucinates about his parents, before meeting the frog on the log. The frog tells him to solve a riddle to find the place where they were last seen, "Where two gums meet, yet stand alone, there's plenty of water, but dry as a bone". Later, the pudding thieves finally succeed in stealing Albert by starting a fire as a distraction, but the Pudding Owners find their house and eventually rescue Albert. 

Albert mocks Bunyip's desire to find his parents, causing Bunyip to lose his temper and kick Albert into two interwoven trees. There, they discover two gum trees overlooking a valley with a dam that feeds water into Tiralu, solving the frog's riddle. As the Pudding Owners head to the town, the thieves open the dam, flooding the town, but Bunyip uses Albert to fill sacks and make a dam. The grateful residents celebrate, and when Bunyip explains his quest, the townspeople take them to the entrance of Buncle's underground lair, saying no one ever comes out. Bunyip begins to despair of ever finding his parents, but Albert slides down inside in his bowl, followed by Bunyip, Bill and Sam. Inside, Buncle is berating the thieves for their failed attempts, when Albert bounces into his lap. Buncle has the thieves thrown in with the slaves before celebrating the capture of the pudding with a large party.

During the party, Bunyip and Bill free the slaves, including Meg and Tom, while Sam distracts Buncle by dressing as a woman. After they escape, Bunyip finally recognizes his parents, and they share a warm reunion, before Bunyip goes with Bill and Sam to rescue Albert from Buncle. As Buncle tries to eat Albert, Bunyip, remembering that Albert can change his pudding forms whenever somebody demands it, demands Albert for a double serving, intending to give Buncle the double. As Albert splits, his good and evil half fight, quickly growing bigger until breaking out of the cavern. Buncle then demands for 'all the puddin's in the world', only to fall into one of the Albert's mouths and is spat far away. Albert splits into millions of puddings before turning back to normal and falling back into his bowl, apparently dead. Everyone begins to mourn, until Albert wakes up, and everyone rejoices. 

Later, Bill, Sam and Albert are living a new life with the Bluegums, as well as Rumpus and Wattleby, the ones who raised Bunyip during his childhood. Bunyip breaks the fourth wall by inviting the viewers to join them for a slice of pudding, unless they happen to be a "pudding thief", while the Pudding Owners foil yet another attempt by the two pudding thieves to get Albert for themselves.

In a mid-credit scene, Buncle is shown to have crash-landed back in the South Pole, where he lands on a floating ice block. He bemoans his failure to capture Albert before falling unconscious as the ice block carries him away.

Cast

 John Cleese as Albert the Magic Pudding: A bad-mannered living pudding who lasts forever and turns into different sorts of puddings.
 Geoffrey Rush as Bunyip Bluegum: An accomplished young koala that leaves home in search of his lost parents.
 Hugo Weaving as Bill Barnacle: A sailor who leads the noble society of Pudding owners group.
 Sam Neill as Sam Sawnoff: A penguin who is a shipmate of Bill Barnacle's cruise.
 Jack Thompson as Buncle: A very selfish and very hungry wombat who is after the magic pudding for himself to eat forever. Also a former shipmate of Bill Barnacle's cruise.
 Toni Collette as Meg Bluegum: The mother of Bunyip Bluegum.
 Roy Billing as Tom Bluegum:  father of Bunyip Bluegum.
 Greg Carroll as Watkin Wombat: The nephew of Buncle who is one of the pudding thieves who has to catch and bring the pudding to him.
 Dave Gibson as Patrick O'Possum: The wombats helper of the pudding thieves, and as Wattleberry: the uncle of Bunyip Bluegum.
 Mary Coustas as Ginger: is the right-hand mouse of Buncle.
 John Laws as Rumpus Bumpus: A wise old friend of Bunyip Bluegum.
 Sandy Gore as Frog on the Log: She helps Bumyip to finding his parents.
 Michael Veitch as Fergus the Bandicoot: He carries the Watermelon.
 Peter Gwynne as Benjamin Brandysnap: an elderly dog who owns a grocery store, once a friend of the pudding thieves, now betrayed by them after they stole his grocery bag and joined the pudding owners for revenge.
 Robyn Moore as Henrietta Hedgehog
 Martin Vaughan as Parrot
 Gerry Connolly as Dobson Dorking

Production 

The Lindsay family had rejected many international requests to sell the rights to The Magic Pudding, preferring to wait until an Australian company presented the right formula. Past contenders were Walt Disney himself and Jim Henson Productions. Finally, the Lindsays signed a deal to Energee Entertainment, one of the country’s leading independent animation companies.

Release
The film was first released in Australia on 14 December 2000, and was released theatrically by the local branch of 20th Century Fox.

The VHS tape and DVD were released in Australia in May 2001 by Roadshow Entertainment.

It was then released in New Zealand four months later after the Australian release on 9 April 2001.

A re-release of the DVD was released in Australia in 2013.

Although the film has yet to have an official DVD or Blu-ray release in North America, it is currently available for streaming on Amazon Prime and Roku.

Release and reception
The Magic Pudding was released to mixed reviews.

Australian critics, such as Louise Keller, Andrew L. Urban, and David Edwards, have given the film positive reviews.

After the film bombed at the box office, Energee went into financial difficulties. It was placed into administration on June 28, 2002 and closed down for good not too long after.

Soundtrack
A soundtrack, recorded by the Marionette Theatre of Australia, was released on 14 July 2001.

Video games
 The Magic Pudding Adventure - The same month when the movie was released, an interactive game called "The Magic Pudding Adventure" was released with video highlights from the movie and 5 re-playable activities including Sink or Swim also released on DVD.

References

External links

 
 
 The Magic Pudding at Oz Movies
 

2000 animated films
2000 films
Australian animated feature films
Australian buddy films
Australian children's animated films
Australian children's musical films
Animated films about penguins
Animated films about birds
Animated films based on Australian novels
Films set in Antarctica
Films set in the Outback
Films set in 1957
Films set in 1967
Films directed by Karl Zwicky
2000s children's films
Animated films about koalas
Animated films about wombats
Films about food and drink
Animated films about kangaroos and wallabies
Films about snakes
Films about magic
20th Century Fox animated films
20th Century Fox films
Icon Productions films
2000s children's animated films
2000s Australian animated films
Films based on works by Norman Lindsay
2000s English-language films
2000s American films